Cuango may refer to:
 Cuango, Angola
 Cuango, Panama

See also
 Quango (disambiguation)